Lloyd Chukwuemeka is a State House of Assembly member representing Owerri-North State Constituency in the Imo State House of Assembly.

Following the power tussle that plagued the Imo State House of Assembly on May 16, 2019 which brought about the resignation of the Deputy Speaker, Ugonna Ozurigbo, Lloyd Chukwuemeka was elected as the new majority leader of the Imo State House of Assembly.

On June 10, 2019 Lloyd Chukwuemeka decamped to the People Democratic Party  following a mass defection at the valedictory session of the 8th Imo Assembly in Owerri, Imo State.

References

Imo State politicians
Living people
Members of the Imo State House of Assembly
Year of birth missing (living people)